Li Jun (born 30 June 1967) is a female Chinese former international table tennis player. She later represented Japan under the name Junko Haneyoshi.

She won bronze medal's at the 1989 World Table Tennis Championships and the 1991 World Table Tennis Championships in the women's doubles with Ding Yaping.

See also
 List of table tennis players
 List of World Table Tennis Championships medalists

References

Japanese female table tennis players
Chinese emigrants to Japan
Table tennis players from Beijing
Naturalised table tennis players
Chinese female table tennis players
1967 births
Living people
World Table Tennis Championships medalists